Paul Richardson (born 16 January 1947) is a British Roman Catholic priest and a former Anglican bishop.

Early life
Richardson was educated at Keswick School, The Queen's College, Oxford, Harvard Divinity School and Cuddesdon Theological College.

Anglican ministry
He was ordained a priest in the Church of England in 1973 and served first as a curate at St John's Earlsfield, London. He was then the assistant chaplain in Oslo, Norway, and then a mission priest at Nambaiyfa in the highlands of Papua New Guinea before becoming the principal of Newton Theological College, Popondetta, and then the dean of St John's Cathedral, Port Moresby.

He was the Bishop of Aipo Rongo in the Anglican Church of Papua New Guinea from 1987 to 1995 when he was translated to the Diocese of Wangaratta in the Anglican Church of Australia. From 1998 to 16 January 2009 he was the Assistant Bishop of Newcastle in the Church of England.

Roman Catholic ministry
On 25 January 2009, the Feast of the Conversion of St Paul, Richardson was received into the Roman Catholic Church. He was re-ordained as a Roman Catholic priest in 2011.

References

People educated at Keswick School
Alumni of The Queen's College, Oxford
Anglican deans in Oceania
Anglican bishops of Wangaratta
Anglican bishop converts to Roman Catholicism
Assistant bishops of Newcastle (1980–2016)
20th-century Anglican bishops in Oceania
1947 births
Living people
Harvard Divinity School alumni
Alumni of Ripon College Cuddesdon
20th-century Church of England bishops
Anglican bishops of Aipo Rongo